The Hamilton-Ely Farmstead, also known as the Evelyn Minor House, is an historic home which is located in Whiteley Township in Greene County, Pennsylvania.

It was listed on the National Register of Historic Places in 2006.

History and architectural features
The house was built around 1835, and is a two-story, five-bay dwelling with a gable roof and blend of Federal, Greek Revival, and Colonial Revival-style details. The front facade features a two-story porch with Tuscan order columns.  

Also located on the property are a contributing barn, which was erected sometime around 1930, a spring house that was built circa 1803, a wash house that was erected sometime around 1870, and drive-through corn crib that was built between 1872 and 1874.

This complex was listed on the National Register of Historic Places in 2006.

References 

Houses on the National Register of Historic Places in Pennsylvania
Federal architecture in Pennsylvania
Greek Revival houses in Pennsylvania
Colonial Revival architecture in Pennsylvania
Houses in Greene County, Pennsylvania
National Register of Historic Places in Greene County, Pennsylvania